Dibamus somsaki, also known commonly as Somsak's blind lizard and Somsak's dibamid lizard,  is a species of legless lizard in the family Dibamidae. The species is endemic to Thailand.

Etymology
The specific name, somsaki, is in honor of Thai zoologist Somsak Panha.

Habitat
The preferred natural habitat of D. somsaki is forest.

Reproduction
D. somsaki is oviparous.

References

Further reading
Chan-ard T, Parr JWK, Nabhitabhata J (2015). A Field Guide to the Reptiles of Thailand. New York: Oxford University Press. 352 pp.  (hardcover),  (paperback).
Honda M, Nabhitabhata J, Ota H, Hikida T (1997). "A new species of Dibamus (Squamata: Dibamidae) from Thailand". Raffles Bulletin of Zoology 45 (2): 275–279. (Dibamus somsaki, new species).

Dibamus
Reptiles of Thailand
Reptiles described in 1997